"When I'm Good and Ready" is a song by American R&B and pop singer-songwriter Sybil, released on March 8, 1993 as the first single from her fifth album, Good 'N' Ready (1993). Written and produced by Stock/Waterman, it also features backing vocals by Mae McKenna, Stock and Miriam Stockley. It went on to become one of her most successful songs and a major hit on the charts in Europe, reaching the top 10 in the UK and Ireland, peaking at number five and six. Additionally, it was a top-20 hit in Austria and a top-50 hit in Germany. On the Eurochart Hot 100, it reached number 21 in May 1993.

In 1997, "When I'm Good and Ready" was re-released in a new remix by UK remix, production and songwriting team Love to Infinity. Their version reached number 66 on the UK Singles Chart.

Critical reception
In their review of the Good 'N' Ready album, Pan-European magazine Music & Media stated, "Her forte is dance with a poppy and exuberant feel to it". Alan Jones from Music Week described the song as a "typically bright and breezy Stock/Waterman production superbly sung by the American diva [that] has instant, if fairly lighweight [sic], appeal." He added, "This is what you're missing, Kylie." James Hamilton from the RM Dance Update complimented it as "superb". Another editor, Tim Jeffery, stated, "The test of a cover version artist is whether they can come through with an original follow-up. Sybil has done just that. Even though the production of this pop/garage tune is heading straight at the Top 40 market." Tony Cross from Smash Hits stated, "After "The Love I Lost", Sybil has another song with "hit" written all over it." He also opined that "her powerful vocals are underused in this repetitive soul-sisters dancerama." 

On the release of the Love to Infinity remix in 1997, Music Week rated it four out of five, adding, "This was great as an anthemic pop dance number (a top five hit in 1993) and is even better now it's been toughened up with a raunchier, soulful feel."

Track listing

 7" single, UK (1993)
A. "When I'm Good and Ready" – 3:38
B. "When I'm Good and Ready" (Good N' Buzzin' Edit) – 3:38

 12", UK (1993)
A. "When I'm Good and Ready" (Jewel & Stone Mix) – 10:00
B1. "When I'm Good and Ready" (7" Version) – 3:38
B2. "When I'm Good and Ready" (12" Club Mix) – 5:15

 CD single, UK (1993)
"When I'm Good and Ready" (7-inch version) – 3:38
"When I'm Good and Ready" (Jewels & Stone Mix) – 10:00
"When I'm Good and Ready" (Classic Dub Mix) – 5:38
"When I'm Good and Ready" (The Woman's Prerogative Mix) – 7:00
"When I'm Good and Ready" (12-inch club mix) – 5:15
"When I'm Good and Ready" (Good N' Buzzin' Mix) – 5:28 

 CD mini single, Japan (1993)
"When I'm Good and Ready" (7" Edit) – 3:35
"When I'm Good and Ready" (Good 'N' Buzzin' Edit) – 3:39

 Cassette single, UK (1993)
"When I'm Good and Ready" – 3:38
"When I'm Good and Ready" (Good N' Buzzin' Edit) – 3:38

 CD maxi, Europe (1997)
"When I'm Good and Ready" (Stratoradio Mix) – 3:50
"When I'm Good and Ready" (Stratomaster Mix) – 7:22
"When I'm Good and Ready" (Telescopic Jippy Dub) – 7:21
"When I'm Good and Ready" (Original Version) – 3:33

Charts

Weekly charts

Year-end charts

References

1993 songs
1993 singles
1997 singles
Sybil (singer) songs
Dance-pop songs
Eurodance songs
FFRR Records artists
Next Plateau Entertainment singles
Pete Waterman Entertainment singles
Songs written by Pete Waterman
Songs written by Mike Stock (musician)